Białocin refers to the following places in Poland:

 Białocin, Łódź Voivodeship
 Białocin, Masovian Voivodeship